Jean Louis "Jackie" Leclair (May 30, 1929 – June 14, 2011) was a Canadian professional ice hockey player who played three seasons in the National Hockey League (NHL) with the Montreal Canadiens. 

Leclair played his entire National Hockey League career with the Montreal Canadiens. He played three seasons with the Habs, from 1954–55 — 1956–57. He is credited with winning one Stanley Cup, in 1956. In 1957, Jack played 47 games for Montreal, qualifying his name to be engraved on the cup, but he was sent to the minors before the playoffs started so his name was left off the cup. The remainder of his career was spent in the QHL, AHL and EHL.

Jack died of old age on June 14, 2011. His death was confirmed by the Society of International Hockey Research.

External links

Picture of Jack LeClair's Name on the 1956 Stanley Cup Plaque

1929 births
2011 deaths
Canadian ice hockey forwards
Charlotte Checkers (EHL) players
French Quebecers
Ice hockey people from Quebec City
Montreal Canadiens players
Pittsburgh Hornets players
Quebec Aces (AHL) players
Quebec Aces (QSHL) players
Stanley Cup champions